George F. Webber (10 May 1876 – 29 August 1967), was a Canadian-born American cinematographer and actor. He cinematographed 171 films between 1914 and 1949.

He was born in Kingston, Ontario, Canada and died in New York, New York, United States.

Partial filmography

 The Eternal Mother (1917)
 An American Widow (1917)
 The Image Maker (1917)
 The Candy Girl (1917)
 A Modern Monte Cristo (1917)
 Go West, Young Man (1918)
 A Man and His Money (1919)
 The City of Comrades (1919)
 One of the Finest (1919)
 Jinx (1919)
 The Gay Lord Quex (1919)
 Lord and Lady Algy (1919)
 Upstairs (1919)
 The Slim Princess (1920)
 Pinto (1920)
 The Blooming Angel (1920)
 The Concert (1921)
 Cinderella of the Hills (1921)
 Extra! Extra! (1922)
 Head Over Heels (1922)
 The Snow Bride (1923)
 The Exciters (1923)
 The Purple Highway (1923)
 The Little Red Schoolhouse (1923)
 Her Love Story (1924)
 Madame Sans-Gene (1925)
 Night Life of New York (1925)
 The Coast of Folly (1925)
 Stage Struck (1925)
 Fine Manners (1926)
 The Joy Girl (1927)
 East Side, West Side (1927)
 Syncopation (1929)
 Going Spanish (1934)
 Downward Slope (1934)
 Mixed Magic (1936)
 The Birth of a Baby (1940)
 Murder on Lenox Avenue (1941)
 Follies Girl (1943)
 Sepia Cinderella (1947)

References

External links

1876 births
1967 deaths
American cinematographers
Canadian emigrants to the United States